Three Musketeers is a Ukrainian-Russian New Year's musical film starring Volodymyr Zelenskyy, Anna Ardova, Ruslana Pysanka and Alyona Sviridova. It is based on the novel of the same name by Alexandre Dumas. The comedy was released on December 31, 2004, on Russia-1 (Russia) and Inter (Ukraine).

Plot
A young and determined d'Artagnan goes to Paris to pursue a career as a musketeer in the Royal Regiment. There he meets Athos, Portos and Aramis, with whom he later forms a warm friendship. Captain of the Women's Regiment De Treville, of course, in such an environment weaves intrigue and gossip. In the French capital d'Artagnan finds his first love, Constance Bonassier. Queen Anne of Austria constantly presses King Louis XIII of France to lead a healthy lifestyle, forcing himto do one or another sport. The King, being of a poetic nature who prefers a bohemian way of life, opposes this in every possible way. The Queen then embarks on an affair with Lord Buckingham. The main enemy of all the heroes is the insidious Cardinal Madame Richelieu.

The authors of this new version of "The Three Musketeers" dared to tell a classic story and cast Dumas in a completely unexpected way. The three musketeers were made women, and the musketeer regiment was made female. Dartaniana (Volodymyr Zelenskyy) no longer associates with the musketeers' male friendship, but rather the relationship of older sisters and mentors.

Cast

Songs
New songs were specially written for the musical. The Composers were Maxim Dunaevsky, Egor Olesov, Ivan Rozin and Vladimir Kripak.

Production
"Three Musketeers" is a whole musical film, not individual reruns with music videos. Director Tina Barkalaya described the musical as "an adult fairy tale with a child's mood." "We want this musical story to go beyond the New Year's project and become a film that viewers would be happy to watch", she also said.

References

External links 

 YouTube - "ТРИ МУШКЕТЕРА" The film
 DzygaMDB - "Три мушкетери"

2004 films
2000s musical films
Films based on The Three Musketeers
2000s Russian-language films
Ukrainian musical films
Volodymyr Zelenskyy films
Ukrainian comedy films